The 2009 South American Rhythmic Gymnastics Championships were held in Guayaquil, Ecuador, December 14–20, 2009. The competition was organized by the Ecuadorian Gymnastics Federation.

Participating nations

Medalists 

Senior

References 

2009 in gymnastics
Rhythmic Gymnastics,2009
2009 in Ecuadorian sport